Deborah Ann Stirling Gallacher (born 30 November 1970) is an English actress. She is known for her roles as George Woodson in the BBC soap opera Doctors and Paula Martin in the ITV soap opera Coronation Street.

Career
Gallacher played George Woodson in the BBC soap opera Doctors from 2003 to 2009. In 2007, she won the award for Best On-Screen Partnership at The British Soap Awards alongside Seán Gleeson, who played her husband, Ronnie Woodson. She has worked with comedian Ricky Gervais, appearing in Gervais' stand-up show Animals and playing Jennifer Taylor-Clarke in both series of The Office. Following this, she appeared in Little Britain in various different roles. She then appeared in 3 episodes of EastEnders in 2017 and in an episode of the Tracy Beaker spin-off The Dumping Ground in October 2017.

Gallacher joined the cast of Coronation Street in August 2018 as Paula Martin, a love interest for established character Sophie Webster (Brooke Vincent). In February 2020, it was announced that Gallacher had joined medical drama Casualty as police officer Ffion Morgan, the wife of established character Jan Jenning (Di Botcher). Gallacher confirmed that she would not leave Coronation Street for the new role, but instead would appear in both shows simultaneously. Gallacher made her Casualty debut on 18 July 2020. For her role as Ffion, Gallacher stated that she wanted to appear different to her Coronation Street character, so she wears a wig due to having an allergy to hair dye.

Personal life
Gallacher has a son, Ulysses, born in January 2004. On 20 June 2009, she married her former Doctors co-star, and on-screen husband, Seán Gleeson. This union produced a son (born 2009).

References

External links

Living people
1970 births
English stage actresses
English television actresses
English soap opera actresses
People from Altrincham